

c
C-500-GR
C-Crystals
C-Gram
C-Phed Tannate
C-Solve-2
c1 esterase inhibitor
C2B8 monoclonal antibody
c7E3
C8-CCK

ca

cab-caf
Ca-DTPA
cabastine (INN)
cabazitaxel (INN, USAN)
Cabenuva
cabergoline (INN)
cabiotraxetan (INN)
Cablivi
Cabometyx
cabotegravir
cabozantinib (USAN, INN)
cactinomycin (INN)
cadazolid (INN)
cadexomer (INN)
cadralazine (INN)
Caduet
Caelyx
cafaminol (INN)
Cafcit
cafedrine (INN)
Cafergot
Cafetrate
caffeine

cal
Cal Carb-HD
Cal-Citrate 250
Cal-G
Cal-Gest
Cal-Lac
Cal-Mint
Cal-Plus

cala-calb
Caladryl Spray
Calan
calaspargase pegol (USAN, INN)
Calbon

calc

calca
Calcarb 600

calci
Calci-Chew
Calci-Mix

calcib-calcit
Calcibind
Calciday-667
calcifediol (INN)
calciferol
Calcijex
Calcimar
Calcionate
Calciparine
calcipotriene (INN)
calcipotriol (INN)
Calciquid
calcitonin, bovine (INN)
calcitonin, chicken (INN)
calcitonin, eel (INN)
calcitonin, human (INN)
calcitonin, porcine (INN)
calcitonin, rat (INN)
calcitonin, salmon (INN)
calcitonin (INN)
calcitriol (INN)

calciu
calcium benzamidosalicylate (INN)
calcium clofibrate (INN)
calcium disodium versenate
calcium dobesilate (INN)
calcium folinate (INN)
calcium glubionate (INN)
calcium glucoheptonate (INN)
calcium levofolinate (INN)
calcium pantothenate (INN)
calcium saccharate (INN)
calcium sodium ferriclate (INN)
calcium trisodium pentetate (INN)

cald-calu
CaldeCORT
Calderol
caldiamide (INN)
Caldolor
calfactant
Calfort
Calmurid HC
CaloMist
Calquence
calteridol (INN)
calusterone (INN)

cam
Cam-Ap-Es
Cam-Metrazine
camazepam (INN)
cambendazole (INN)
Cambia
Camcevi
camiglibose (INN)
Camila
camiverine (INN)
camobucol (USAN, INN)
camonagrel (INN)
Camoquin
camostat (INN)
Campath (Millennium and ILEX Partners, LP)
Campho-Phenique
camphotamide (INN)
Camptosar
Camptosar (Pharmacia & Upjohn Company)
Camrese
camylofin (INN)

can
canagliflozin (USAN)
canakinumab (INN)
Canasa
canbisol (INN)
Cancidas
candesartan (INN)
Candex
candicidin (INN)
Candin
Candistatin
candocuronium iodide (INN)
candoxatril (INN)
candoxatrilat (INN)
canertinib (USAN)
canfosfamide (USAN)
cangrelor (USAN)
Cankaid
cannabinol (INN)
cannabis
canosimibe (INN)
canrenoic acid (INN)
canrenone (INN)
Cantharone
Cantil
cantuzumab mertansine (INN)
cantuzumab ravtansine (USAN, INN)

cap
Cap-Profen
capadenoson (INN)
Capastat
capecitabine (INN)
capeserod (INN)
Capex
Capital with codeine
Capitrol
caplacizumab-yhdp
Caplyta
capmatinib 
capobenic acid (INN)
Capoten
Capozide
Caprelsa
capreomycin (INN)
capromab pendetide (INN)
capromorelin (INN)
caproxamine (INN)
caprylidene
Capsagel
capsaicin
captodiame (INN)
Captohexal (Hexal Australia) [Au], also known as captopril
captopril (INN)
capuride (INN)
Capzasin-HP

car

cara
carabersat (INN)
Carac
caracemide (INN)
Carafate
carafiban (INN)
caramiphen (INN)
carazolol (INN)

carb

carba-carbe
carbachol (INN)
carbadox (INN)
Carbaglu
carbaldrate (INN)
carbamazepine (INN)
carbamide peroxide
carbantel (INN)
carbaril (INN)
carbarsone (INN)
carbasalate calcium (INN)
Carbastat
Carbatrol
Carbaxefed RF
carbazeran (INN)
carbazochrome salicylate (INN)
carbazochrome sodium sulfonate (INN)
carbazochrome (INN)
carbazocine (INN)
carbenicillin (INN)
carbenoxolone (INN)
carbenzide (INN)
carbetapentane
carbetapentane tannate
carbetimer (INN)
carbetocin (INN)

carbi-carbu
carbidopa (INN)
carbifene (INN)
carbimazole (INN)
carbinoxamine (INN)
Carbiset Tablet
Carbocaine with Neo-Cobefrin
Carbocaine
carbocisteine (INN)
carbocloral (INN)
carbocromen (INN)
Carbodec Syrup
carbofenotion (INN)
Carbolith
carbomycin (INN)
carbon monoxide (USAN)
carboplatin (INN)
carboprost (INN)
Carboptic
carboquone (INN)
carbromal (INN)
carbubarb (INN)
carburazepam (INN)
carbutamide (INN)
carbuterol (INN)

carc-carl
carcainium chloride (INN)
Cardem
Cardene
Cardinorm (Hexal Australia) [Au], also known as amiodarone
Cardio-Green
Cardiogen-82
Cardiografin
Cardiolite
Cardioplegic
Cardioquin
Cardiotec
Cardizem
Cardizem CD
Cardizem LA
Cardrase
Cardura
Cardura XL
carebastine (INN)
carfecillin (INN)
carfenazine (INN)
carfentanil (INN)
carfilzomib (USAN, INN)
carfimate (INN)
carglumic acid (USAN)
cargutocin (INN)
caricotamide (INN)
Carimune
carindacillin (INN)
cariporide (INN)
cariprazine (INN, (USAN)
carisbamate (USAN)
carisoprodol (INN)
carlecortemcel-L (USAN)
carlumab (USAN, INN)

carm-cars
carmantadine (INN)
carmegliptin (USAN, INN)
carmellose (INN)
carmetizide (INN)
carmofur (INN)
Carmol HC
Carmol 10
Carmol 20
Carmol 40
Carmol HC
carmoxirole (INN)
carmustine (INN)
Carnation Instant Breakfast
Carnexiv
carnidazole (INN)
carnitine (INN)
Carnitor
carocainide (INN)
Caroid
Carospir
carotegrast (INN)
caroverine (INN)
caroxazone (INN)
carperidine (INN)
carperitide (INN)
carperone (INN)
carpindolol (INN)
carpipramine (INN)
carprazidil (INN)
carprofen (INN)
carpronium chloride (INN)
Carrington Antifungal
carsalam (INN)
carsatrin (INN)

cart-carz
cartasteine (INN)
cartazolate (INN)
Carteolol
carteolol (INN)
Cartia XT
Carticel
Cartrol
carubicin (INN)
carumonam (INN)
carvedilol (INN)
carvotroline (INN)
carzelesin (INN)
carzenide (INN)

cas-cav
casimersen
casirivimab and imdevimab
Casodex
casokefamide (INN)
casopitant (USAN, INN)
caspofungin (INN)
Casporyn
Cassipa
Castellani paint
Cataflam
Catapres
Catapres-TTS
Catarase
Cathflo Activase
cathine (INN)
cathinone (INN)
catramilast (USAN, INN)
catridecacog (INN)
catumaxomab (INN)
Caverject
Cayston